NEL or Nel may refer to:

People
 Nel (name)

Acronym
 Navy Electronics Laboratory
 National Engineering Laboratory
 New England League, a baseball minor league
 New English Library, a British book publishing company
 Norvega Esperantista Ligo, the Norwegian esperanto organization
 NEL pipeline (Norddeutsche Erdgas Leitung)
 North East MRT line, Singapore
 North East Lincolnshire, a unitary authority in England

Other uses
 Naval Air Engineering Station Lakehurst's (also called NAEC Airport) IATA code
 Nelson railway station's National Rail station code
 Nel ASA, Norwegian hydrogen fuel and fuel cell company
 Nel Tu, a character in the Bleach series
 Nel, an ISO C0 and C1 control code for a newline